The 1924–25 Cornell Big Red men's ice hockey season was the 20th season of play for the program. The teams was coached by Nick Bawlf in his 5th season.

Season
The weather wasn't kind at the start of the season, but it was more accommodating than it had been the year before. Cornell was able to get some practice in before Christmas but the team had some unwelcome news at the beginning of their season. Two starters from '24 who were expected to be on the team were ineligible. Burnett and Kidd, key players in Cornell's offense, wouldn't be able to play this season and coach Bawlf would have to scramble to find their replacements. The lake froze well and the first game with Boston University was played on the 10th. The new lineup didn't have enough practice time together and visitors displayed much better cohesion in their 7–2 win.

An increase in practice time followed and the team responded with a win over MAC the following week. The team's defense was far sturdier and held the Aggies without much of a chance to score for the first two periods. As had happened during the first game, Tilton remained at center for the entire contest while several players were rotated through both wing positions. The team played their next match a week later but were stymied by a stingy MIT squad, managing just 1 goal in a biting wind.

The team wen dormant for several weeks during the exam period and their restart was delayed even further when the match against Clarkson was cancelled due to poor ice conditions. The next team was against a familiar opponent in Princeton and there was hope that the Big red could take advantage of a weakened Tiger squad. However, Cornell was hampered by a lack of practice and the team was soundly defeated. Moving Tilton back to defense provided a boon to the blue line but the team was unable to stop the Princeton offense from seemingly scoring at will. The final game of the year came against Hamilton and the team was held scoreless by their opponents.

Roster

Standings

Schedule and Results

|-
!colspan=12 style=";" | Regular Season

Scoring Statistics

Note: Assists were not recorded as a statistic.

References

Cornell Big Red men's ice hockey seasons
Cornell
Cornell
Cornell
Cornell